Argyrotaenia guatemalica is a species of moth of the family Tortricidae. It is found in Guatemala.

References

G
Endemic fauna of Guatemala
Moths of Central America
Moths described in 1914